Heterogynis eremita is a moth in the Heterogynidae family. It was described by Alberto Zilli, R. Cianchi, T. Racheli and L. Bullini in 1988.

References

Heterogynidae
Moths described in 1988